The Paths of King Nikola was a road bicycle race held annually in Montenegro. The name is a reference to King Nikola I (1841–1921), the ruler of the Principality of Montenegro. The first edition was in 2002; since 2005, it is organized as a 2.2 event on the UCI Europe Tour.

Winners

External links
 2009 The Paths of King Nikola

References

UCI Europe Tour races
Cycle races in Montenegro
Recurring sporting events established in 2002
2002 establishments in Montenegro
Spring (season) events in Montenegro
Recurring sporting events disestablished in 2011